Pierre Étaix (23 November 1928 – 14 October 2016) was a French clown, comedian and filmmaker. Étaix made a series of short- and feature-length films, many of them co-written by influential screenwriter Jean-Claude Carrière. He won an Academy Award for best live action short film in 1963. Due to a legal dispute with a distribution company, his films were unavailable from the 1970s until 2009.

As an actor, assistant director and gag writer, Étaix worked with the likes of Jacques Tati, Robert Bresson, Nagisa Oshima, Otar Iosseliani and Jerry Lewis, the last of whom cast the comedian in his unreleased film The Day the Clown Cried.

Biography
Étaix was born in 1928 in Roanne, France. He was trained as a graphic designer and introduced to the art of stained glass by Théodore-Gérard Hanssen.  He settled in Paris where he worked as a magazine illustrator while performing in cabarets and music halls, such as The Golden Horse, The Three Donkeys, ABC, the Alhambra, Bobino and Olympia, and a circus performer with the clown Nino.
 
He met Jacques Tati in 1954 and worked as a draftsman and gagman on Tati's film Mon Oncle (1958), including the creation of the film's promotional poster, then as assistant director. According to many film critics as well as his fellow film makers, Pierre Étaix was a continuation of the great masters of slapstick and the comedy film the silent era such as Buster Keaton, Harold Lloyd, Harry Langdon, Max Linder, Charlie Chaplin, and Laurel and Hardy.

His first feature films as director were The Suitor (1962) and Yoyo (1965), where he paid homage to the circus world. He then directed an anthology film of four shorts, As Long as You've Got Your Health (1966), and  The Great Love (1969).  Both of these were co-written with Carrière.

Faced with the scarcity of French circus artists, Étaix decided to found the National Circus School (1973) with Annie Fratellini, whom he married in 1969, and wore a white clown suit during tours of their own circus, having long played the tramp.

Etaix died from complications of an intestinal infection on 14 October 2016 in Paris. He was 87.

Jerry Lewis once remarked that twice in his life he understood what genius meant: the first time when he looked up the definition in a dictionary, and the second time when he met Pierre Etaix.

Awards
Louis Delluc Prize, 1962, for Le Soupirant
Special Diploma, 1963, for Le Soupirant at the 3rd Moscow International Film Festival
 Academy Award, Best Short Subject, Live Action Subjects (1963), for Heureux anniversaire  shared with Jean-Claude Carrière
 Telluride Film Festival Silver Medallion, 2011
 Aardman Slapstick Visual Comedy Award, 2012
 Commandeur des Arts et des Lettres, 2013
 Grand Prize of the SACD (Society of Dramatic Authors and Composers), 2013

Filmography

As director
Rupture (1961) short
Insomnie (1962) short, incorporated into As Long as You've Got Your Health 1971 edition)
Heureux Anniversaire (Happy Anniversary, 1962) short
Le Soupirant (The Suitor, 1962)
Yoyo (1965)
Tant qu'on a la santé (As Long As You've Got Your Health, 1966, re-edited 1971)
Le grand amour (1969)
Pays de cocagne (Land of Milk and Honey, 1971) documentary
L'âge de Monsieur est avancé (1987) TV film
Méliès 88: Rêve d'artiste (1988) TV short
J'écris dans l'espace (1989) documentary featurette
En pleine forme (Feeling Good, As Long as You've Got Your Health segment, deleted 1971, released standalone 2010)
Unreleased

 Nous n'irons plus au bois (1961) short

TV series episodes 

 Souris noire (1987)

Performances
Pickpocket (1959) - second accomplice
Tire-au-flanc 62 (The Army Game, 1960) - Le chef de gare (uncredited)
Rupture (1961, Short) - L'homme qui reçoit une lettre de rupture
Une grosse tête (1962)
Heureux anniversaire (1962, Short) - Le mari
Le Soupirant (1962) - Pierre, the Suitor
Le Pèlerinage (1962, Short)
Yo Yo (1965) - Yoyo / le millionaire
Tant qu'on a la santé (As Long As We've Got Our Health, 1966) - Pierre
Le Voleur (The Thief of Paris, 1967) - Le pickpocket (uncredited)
Le Grand Amour (1969) - Pierre
I Clowns (1970, TV Movie) - Himself
Bel Ordure (1973)
Sérieux comme le plaisir (1975) - Le garçon d'étage
Noctuor (1978, Short)
La Métamorphose (1983, TV Movie)
Max, mon amour (1985) - Le détective / Detective
Nuit docile (1987) - SOS Amor
L'âge de monsieur est avancé (1987) - L'auteur
Henry & June (1990) - Henry's Friend No. 1
Jardins en automne (Gardens in Autumn, 2006)
Lucifer et moi (2008)
Micmacs à tire-larigot (2009) - L'inventeur des histoires drôles (uncredited)
Chantrapas (2010) - Le producteur français
Le Havre (2011) - Docteur Becker
Chant d'hiver (2015) - Marquis-clochard
Unreleased

 The Day the Clown Cried (1972, unreleased) - Gustav

References

External links
 

1928 births
2016 deaths
People from Roanne
French clowns
French male actors
French film directors
Commandeurs of the Ordre des Arts et des Lettres